José Antonio Vaquero  (19 December 1924 – 22 September 2006) was de facto Federal Interventor of Córdoba, Argentina from 24 March 1976 to 12 April 1976.

See also
Operation Soberanía

References
Biography of José Vaquero 

1924 births
2006 deaths
Argentine generals
Governors of Córdoba Province, Argentina